The Roman Catholic Diocese of Camaçari is located in the city of Camaçari, Bahia, Brazil.  It is a suffragan see to the Archdiocese of São Salvador da Bahia.

History
On 15 December 2010, Pope Benedict XVI established the Diocese of Camaçari from the Archdiocese of São Salvador da Bahia.

Ordinaries
João Carlos Petrini (15 Dec 2010–27 October 2021)
Dirceu de Oliveira Medeiros (27 October 2021–)

References

Roman Catholic dioceses in Brazil
Christian organizations established in 2010
Roman Catholic Ecclesiastical Province of São Salvador da Bahia
Roman Catholic dioceses and prelatures established in the 21st century
2010 establishments in Brazil
Camaçari